Hyun Young (born Yoo Hyun-young on September 6, 1976) is a South Korean entertainer. She has worked as a model, TV show host, actress, singer, instructor for Public relations and Personal Financial Planning at colleges, companies. Educated at Yong In University and Korea University, she is known for her unusual, almost cartoon-like voice.

Career

Television 
Hyun Young appears in numerous Korean television shows, and was mainstay on KBS's variety show, Heroine 6, since 2005 until the show's final episode in 2007. For her work on various shows, she won the 2006 Best Female Star award (for variety/comedy) on both the MBC and KBS Entertainment Awards. Since 2007, she has acted as one of the team leaders for the variety show Jiwhaza! ("Burst! Mental concentration"), airing on SBS. She is also one of the main 5 stars on KBS's High-Five, part of its Happy Sunday line-up. She was also part of Introducing a Star's Friend as a presenter.

Music 
Hyun Young has recorded the Korean version of "Dragostea din tei" (otherwise known as the Numa Numa song), titled "Nuna's Dream" ("누나의 꿈"); the "Numa Numa" lyrics are changed to "Nuna Nuna" (the Korean term used by males for an older woman) in 2006. The album did not achieve great sales, nor was the song officially promoted and sung on the music charts. Hyun Young instead sung it on the variety shows she appeared on, which allowed it to become somewhat popular as a novelty song with its own novelty dance (called the "Nuna Nuna" dance). Her video for the single became the most watched music video in 2006, according to M.net. In May 2007, Hyun Young released her second single "Love Revolution" ("연애 혁명"), a cover of Morning Musume's "Renai Revolution 21".

Personal life
Hyun Young married Choi Won-hee at the Sheraton Grande Walkerhill Hotel on March 3, 2012; her husband works at a multi-national financial firm. She gave birth to their first child on August 16, 2012.

During a 2013 investigation into propofol abuse among celebrities, Hyun Young admitted to getting doctor-prescribed injections 42 times between February and December 2011. She was not indicted, and was instead ordered to pay an  fine.

Philanthropy 
On February 10, 2023, Hyunyoung donated  to help 2023 Turkey–Syria earthquake, by donating money through Hope Bridge National Disaster Relief Association.

Variety show appearances 
 1997 – SBS 이주일 투나잇 쇼 (Week Tonight Show)
 2002 – MBC 여자를 말한다 (A Woman Says)
 2005 – 여러분! 고맙습니다 (Your Thanks)
 2005 – KBS 해피 선데이: 여걸 식스 (Happy Sunday: Heroine 6)
 2005 – KBS 쇼 파워 비디오 (Show Power Video)
 2006 – MBC 섹션 TV 연예 통신 (Section TV)
 2006 – SBS 헤이헤이헤이 2 (Hey Hey Hey 2)
 2006 – SBS 슈퍼 아이 (Super Eye)
 2007 – KBS 하이-파이브 (High-Five)
 2008 – KBS 이 맛에 산다 (Delicious Quiz: A Taste of Life)
 2011 – SBS Running Man (Episode 31)
 2020 – MBC King of Mask Singer (Episodes 275–276)
 2022 - JTBC Knowing Bros (Episode 313)

Filmography

Films 
 2003 – First Amendment
 2004 – Father and Son: The Story of Mencius
 2004 – A Moment to Remember
 2005 – Marrying the Mafia II (cameo)
 2005 – Princess Aurora
 2005 – The Art of Seduction
 2006 – The Legend of Seven Cutter
 2006 – Now and Forever (cameo)
 2006 – Aachi & Ssipak (voice)
 2006 – My Wife Is a Gangster 3
 2007 – The Perfect Couple
 2009 – Fortune Salon
 2011 – Marrying the Mafia IV: Unstoppable Family
 2022 – Jajangmyeon Thank you - as Kim Hye-jin

Television dramas 
 1997 – SBS Wind's Love
 2003 – SBS Fairy and Swindler
 2005 – SBS Biscuit Teacher and Star Candy
 2005 – SBS Fashion 70's
 2005 – MBC Hello Franceska Season 3
 2005 – MBC The Secret Lovers
 2006 – SBS Bad Family
 2010 – SBS OB/GYN Doctors
 2011 – KBS2 Baby Faced Beauty
 2011 – SBS Living in Style (cameo)
 2015 – KBS2 The Producers (cameo)

Discography

Singles 
 March 9, 2006 – "Nuna's Dream" ("누나의 꿈")
 May 2007 – "Love Revolution" ("연애 혁명")

Albums 
 April 28, 2006 – Hyun Young's Gayo Remix : Best of Club Gayo Hits

Bibliography 
 Smart Financial HabitPublished in October 2008, 
 Diary of Financial TechnologyPublished in May 2008,

Awards and nominations

References

External links 
 
 

1976 births
Living people
People from Suwon
South Korean women pop singers
South Korean film actresses
South Korean television actresses
South Korean television presenters
South Korean women television presenters
South Korean radio presenters
South Korean female models
Yong In University alumni
Seokyeong University alumni
South Korean criminals
21st-century South Korean singers
21st-century South Korean women singers
South Korean women radio presenters